The Our Lady of Mount Carmel Cathedral is a cathedral of the Roman Catholic Church in the Northern Mariana Islands, a territory of the United States. It is the mother church and seat of the bishop of the Diocese of Chalan Kanoa. The church is located in the village of Chalan Kanoa on the island of Saipan.

See also
List of Catholic cathedrals in the United States
List of cathedrals in the United States

References

Roman Catholic cathedrals in the Northern Mariana Islands